Eulithis molliculata, the dimorphic eulithis, is a species of geometrid moth in the family Geometridae. It is found in North America.

Its larval host is common ninebark.

The MONA or Hodges number for Eulithis molliculata is 7203.

References

Further reading

 
 

Hydriomenini
Articles created by Qbugbot
Moths described in 1862